A recursive wave is a self-similar curve in three-dimensional space that is constructed by iteratively adding a helix around the previous curve.

Construction 

A recursive wave of depth  can be constructed as following:

where

and

Clarification

Each wave at non-zero depth  is described by an amplitude , frequency  and phase offset .

An arbitrary vector  is chosen to be the fixed "rag" vector.

 is a function that rotates a vector  around an axis defined by a vector  by  degrees. In this case it is expressed with quaternions.

See also
Solenoid (DNA)

Curves